Left of the Isar, Right of the Spree is a 1929 German silent film directed by Franz Seitz.

It was made at the Emelka Studios in Munich. The film's sets were designed by Ludwig Reiber.

A 1940 film was made with the same title.

Cast
In alphabetical order
Karl Flemisch

Hella Helios
Georgia Lind
Maria Meyerhofer
Albert Paulig
Weiß Ferdl

References

External links

Films of the Weimar Republic
Films directed by Franz Seitz
German silent feature films
Bavaria Film films
Films set in Munich
German black-and-white films
Films shot at Bavaria Studios